Trachyliopus is a genus of longhorn beetles of the subfamily Lamiinae, containing the following species:

subgenus Pseudoranova
 Trachyliopus albosignata Breuning, 1980
 Trachyliopus androyensis Breuning, 1957
 Trachyliopus forticornis (Fairmaire, 1901)
 Trachyliopus fuscosignatus (Fairmaire, 1886)
 Trachyliopus multifasciculatus Breuning, 1940
 Trachyliopus pauliani Breuning, 1957

subgenus Trachyliopus
 Trachyliopus affinis Breuning, 1957
 Trachyliopus annulicornis Fairmaire, 1901
 Trachyliopus fairmairei Breuning, 1957
 Trachyliopus fulvosparsus (Fairmaire, 1903)
 Trachyliopus minor (Fairmaire, 1902)
 Trachyliopus subannulicornis Breuning, 1970

References

Crossotini